Guillaume Rufin is the defending champion, after defeating Peter Gojowczyk.

Simone Bolelli won the title, beating Michael Berrer 6–4, 7–6(7–2).

Seeds

Draw

Finals

Top half

Bottom half

References
Main Draw
Qualifying Draw

2014 MS
Oberstaufen Cup - Men's Singles